Salpeter may refer to:

Science
 11757 Salpeter, a minor planet found in 1960 by a team from Palomar Observatory
 Bethe–Salpeter equation, describes two-particle quantum field binding, derived by Hans Bethe and Edwin Salpeter
 Salpeter process, a process of nuclear fusion mathematically defined by Edwin Salpeter
 Salpeter initial mass function, an early and influential model for the distribution of the masses of stars upon formation

People
 Edwin Ernest Salpeter (1924–2008), US astronomer
 Greta Salpeter (born 1988), U.S. musician
 Lonah Chemtai Salpeter (born 1988), Kenyan-Israeli Olympic runner
 Miriam Salpeter (1929—2000). US neurobiologist, wife of Edwin Ernest Salpeter

See also
 Saltpeter (disambiguation)
 Pitié-Salpêtrière Hospital, a teaching hospital in Paris, France